David Fickling is an English children's book editor and publisher based in Oxford. Fickling runs David Fickling Books, which became an independent publishing house in July 2013. He has published books by authors including Philip Pullman, Mark Haddon, John Boyne and Linda Newbery.
He began his career at the Oxford University Press, and later worked at Transworld and Scholastic, before setting up David Fickling Books in 2000, first as an imprint with Scholastic then under Random House. It has since become an  independent publishing house, working in partnership with larger publishers.

In 2004, David won the British Book Awards Editor of the Year.

Fickling also runs David Fickling Comics, which publishes The Phoenix comic, a story comic for children containing no advertising and all original artwork, a reincarnation of The DFC which ceased publishing on 27 March 2009.

References

External links
Company website
The Phoenix Comic

Year of birth missing (living people)
Living people
English publishers (people)
David Fickling Comics